Stjepan Grgac was a Yugoslav cyclist, who rode for Sokol Zagreb. He was four time Yugoslav national road race champion and he also competed on Tour de France in 1936.

In his honor, Stjepan Grgac Memorial, an international cycling race, is held every year since 1971.

In 2014 Hrvoje Bučar made a movie about him, titled Zabilježen u zvijezdama - Stjepan Grgac.

References

Stjepan Grgac Movie, Croatian Cycling Federation

1909 births
1960 deaths
Yugoslav male cyclists
Croatian male cyclists